Naiadacarus is a genus of mites in the family Acaridae.

Species
 Fagacarus arboricola Fashing, 1974
 Fagacarus fashingi O'Connor, 1989
 Fagacarus mydophilus O'Connor, 1989
 Fagacarus nepenthicola Fashing & Chua, 2002

References

Acaridae